Ancylosoma is a monotypic snout moth genus described by Rolf-Ulrich Roesler in 1973. It contains the single species Ancylosoma substratellum described by Hugo Theodor Christoph in 1877. It was described from Turkmenistan, but is also known from Romania and Russia.

The wingspan is about 10 mm.

References

Phycitini
Monotypic moth genera
Moths of Europe
Moths of Asia
Moths described in 1877
Pyralidae genera